The Battle of Erzincan occurred in 1507, it was led by Selim I, then the governor of Trabzon, against the Safavids.

Background
In 1505 Shah Ismail’s brother Ebrahim set off with an army of 3,000 men to pillage Selim’s province, however the Safavid army was routed, Selim pursued them as far as Erzincan where he massacred many of them and captured their arms and munitions.

Battle
In 1507 the Safavids under Shah Ismail led another raid into Anatolia against Alauddevle of the Dulkadirids. This was a violation of Ottoman sovereignty seeing that Shah Ismail had marched through Ottoman lands and recruited into his army Turkmen fighters who were Ottoman subjects. Bayezid II did not retaliate to this raid, however Selim I, then the governor of Trabzon, led an attack against Erzincan and defeated a Safavid army that was sent against him by Shah Ismail.

Aftermath
The next year Selim led an expedition against Georgia during which he subdued western Georgia and brought Imeriti and Guria under Ottoman domination. Another Safavid offensive was launched against the Ottomans in 1510 when Shah Ismail’s brother led an army against Trabzon which Selim I defeated.

References

Battles involving the Ottoman Empire
Wars involving the Ottoman Empire
Battles involving Iran